Anuradha Patel (born 30 August 1961) is an Indian actress of the famous Ganguly family.

Early life
Anuradha was born in Mumbai. Her maternal grandfather is the Hindi veteran actor Ashok Kumar and her grand-uncle is Kishore Kumar.

Personal life
She is married to actor Kanwaljit Singh. They have two sons Sidharth and Aditya.

Career
Patel made her film debut in the 1983 film Love in Goa paired opposite former child actor Mayur Verma. She went onto appear in successful films like Utsav (1984), Phir Aayee Barsat (1985), Dharm Adhikari, Sadaa Suhagan (1986), Ijaazat (1987), Rukhsat (1988). But then she did not get lead roles in films from 1989 and chose to do Television and advertisements. She took an hiatus from acting from the early 1990s to focus on her family and sons, yet continued her career in modeling. After a 10-year break, she returned to films in the late 2000s appearing in films like Jaane Tu Ya Jaane Na (2008) Khaap with Om Puri, Ready (2011) Aisha, Dhantya Open and more.

Apart from being an actor, she is also the director of Dynamic Finishing Academy for Personality Development, Public Speaking, Grooming and Confidence Building which she conceptualized in 1987. She also played cameos in the Star Plus serials Dekho Magar Pyaar Se and Kyunki Saas Bhi Kabhi Bahu Thi opposite Jeetendra. She presently continues to act in selected films and for advertisements such as Samsung, Aashirwad Atta, Milton, PC Chandra jewelers and more which leaves her time to focus on her family too. She recently acted in the 2021 Amazon fashion advertisement along with her husband Kawaljit Singh.

Honours
Anuradha was nominated for the Filmfare Award for Best Supporting Actress for Ijaazat (1987) besides others.
Received Perfect Achievers Award For “Best Personality Development” Classes (2018) given by Gurubhai Thakkar the organizer.

Filmography

Love in Goa (1983)
Utsav (1984)
All Rounder (1984)
Phir Aayee Barsat (1985)
Bandhan Anjana (1985)
Anantyatra (1985)
Paththar (15 March 1985) as Gomti Resham singh
Jaan Ki Baazi (25 October 1985)
Dharam Adhikari (1986)
Sadaa Suhagan (1986)
Duty (1986 film) (19 September 1986)
Kaun Kitney Pani Mein (13 March 1987)
Ijaazat (1987) as Maya
Rukhsat (10 June 1988)
Tohfa Mohabbat Ka (1988)
Dayavan (1988)
Tohfa Mohabbat Ka (1988)
Mera Naseeb (1989)
Gharwali Baharwali (1988 film)
Eina Mina Dika(1989) Special Appearance in Marathi Film
Jyoti (1988)
Apne Begaane (1989)
Gentleman (1989)
Lohe Ke Haath (1990)
Abu Kaliya (1990)
Deewane (1991)
Benaam Rishte (1992)
Manvini Bhavai  (Gujarati) (1994)Tujhe Meri Kasam (2003)Hamari Beti (2006)Dus Kahaniyaan (2007)Jaane Tu... Ya Jaane Na (2008)Aisha (2010)Ready (2011)Rabba Main Kya Karoon (2013)It's My Life (2020)Radhe Shyam'' (2022)

References

External links
 

Indian film actresses
Gujarati people
1961 births
Living people